A yellowtail may be any of several different species of fish. Most commonly the yellowtail amberjack Seriola lalandi is meant. In the context of sushi, yellowtail usually refers to the Japanese amberjack, Seriola quinqueradiata. Other species called simply "yellowtail" include:

Atlantic bumper, Chloroscombrus chrysurus
Yellowtail flounder, Limanda ferruginea
Yellowtail snapper, Ocyurus chrysurus
Whitespotted devil, Plectroglyphidodon lacrymatus
Yellowtail horse mackerel, Trachurus novaezelandiae

In addition, "yellowtail" appears in many other common names of fish:

Butter yellowtail Seriolina nigrofasciata
California yellowtail Seriola dorsalis
Cape yellowtail Seriola lalandi
Common yellowtail croaker Umbrina xanti
Dusky yellowtail Seriolina nigrofasciata
Giant yellowtail Seriola lalandi
Great yellowtail Seriola dumerili
Greater yellowtail Seriola dumerili
Indian yellowtail angelfish Apolemichthys xanthurus
Longfin yellowtail Seriola rivoliana
Pacific yellowtail emperor Lethrinus atkinsoni
Queensland yellowtail angelfish Chaetodontoplus meredithi
Rainbow yellowtail Elagatis bipinnulata
Redbelly yellowtail fusilier Caesio cuning
Slender yellowtail kingfish Alepes djedaba
Southeast Asian yellowtail rasbora Rasbora tornieri
Southern yellowtail Seriola lalandi
Yellowtail amberjack Seriola lalandi
Yellowtail angelfish Apolemichthys xanthurus
Yellowtail angelfish Centropyge fisheri
Yellowtail angelfish Chaetodontoplus personifer
 Yellowtail ballyhoo  Hemiramphus brasiliensis
Yellowtail barracuda Sphyraena flavicauda
Yellowtail bass Bathyanthias mexicana
Yellowtail blue snapper Paracaesio xanthura
Yellowtail butterflyfish Chaetodon xanthurus
Yellowtail catfish Pangasius pangasius
Yellowtail chromis Chromis enchrysura
Yellowtail clownfish Amphiprion clarkii
Yellowtail clownfish Amphiprion sebae
Yellowtail coris Coris gaimard
Yellowtail croaker Austronibea oedogenys
Yellowtail damsel Microspathodon chrysurus
Yellowtail damsel Pomacentrus trichourus
Yellowtail damselfish Microspathodon chrysurus
Yellowtail dascyllus Dascyllus flavicaudus
Yellowtail demoiselle Neoglyphidodon polyacanthus
Yellowtail dottyback Pseudochromis linda
Yellowtail emperor Lethrinus crocineus
Yellowtail fangblenny mimic Plagiotremus laudandus
Yellowtail flounder Limanda ferruginea
Yellowtail fusilier Caesio cuning
Yellowtail fusilier Caesio teres
Yellowtail fusilier Paracaesio xanthura
Yellowtail goldie Pseudanthias evansi
Yellowtail hamlet Hypoplectrus chlorurus
Yellowtail kingfish Caranx heberi
Yellowtail mullet Liza vaigiensis
Yellowtail mullet Sicamugil cascasia
Yellowtail parrot Sparisoma rubripinne
Yellowtail parrotfish Sparisoma rubripinne
Yellowtail poison-fang blenny Meiacanthus atrodorsalis
Yellowtail rasbora Rasbora dusonensis
Yellowtail rasbora Rasbora tornieri
Yellowtail reefcod Epinephelus flavocaeruleus
Yellowtail reeffish Chromis enchrysura
Yellowtail rockcod Epinephelus flavocaeruleus
Yellowtail rockfish Sebastes flavidus
Yellowtail sailfin tang Zebrasoma xanthurum
Yellowtail sardinella Sardinella rouxi
Yellowtail scad Atule mate
Yellowtail scad Trachurus novaezelandiae
Yellowtail sergeant Abudefduf notatus
Yellowtail snapper Ocyurus chrysurus
Yellowtail surgeonfish Prionurus punctatus
Yellowtail surgeonfish Zebrasoma xanthurum
Yellowtail tamarin Anampses meleagrides
Yellowtail tang Zebrasoma xanthurum
Yellowtail tetra Alestopetersius caudalis
Yellowtail trumpeter Amniataba caudavittata
Yellowtail tubelip Diproctacanthus xanthurus
Yellowtail wrasse Anampses meleagrides

Fish common names